Zəhmətabad (also, Zakhmetabad and Zakhmet-Abod) is a village and municipality in the Jalilabad Rayon of Azerbaijan.  It has a population of 589.

References 

Populated places in Jalilabad District (Azerbaijan)